is a neighbourhood located in Akita City, Akita Prefecture, Japan. , the neighbourhood had an estimated population of 21,310 and a population density of 3,400 persons per km². Annexed by the city in 1941, it borders the neighborhoods of Shogunno on the east, Iijima on the north, Mukaihama on the west and Terauchi on the south. The Tsuchizaki area is a port town that developed at the mouth of the Omono River and a place of Port of Akita and Japan Railway Tsuchizaki factory. Tsuchizaki Float Festival is a celebration in the neighbourhood, held every year from July 20 to 21. The Tsuchizaki air raid burned the port facilities and killed more than 250 people on August 14 and 15, 1945.

Schools
 Tsuchizaki Elementary School
 Tsuchizaki Minami Elementary School
 Kohoku Elementary School
 Tsuchizaki Junior High School
 Akita Chuo High School

Surrounding area
Port of Akita Nakajima Pier
 Nakajima Pier Ferry Terminal
 Roadside Station Akita port Akita Port Tower Selion (Akita City Port Tower)
 Akita City Northern Citizen Service Center
 Tsuchizaki Minato History Tradition Hall
 Akita Rinko Police Station
 Akita Maritime Japan Coast Guard

Notable people
 Akita Sanesue, daimyo
 Dewaminato Rikichi, sumo wrestler
 Yukiko Ebata, volleyball player
 Kenzo Futaki, doctor
 Ōmi Komaki, scholar and translator
 Miya Sato (volleyball player, born 1990)

See also

 Port Tower Selion
 Tsuchizaki Station
 Minato Castle
 Pizza-La

References

Akita (city)
Geography of Akita Prefecture
Neighbourhoods in Japan